The 1934 Georgia Bulldogs football team  represented the Georgia Bulldogs of the University of Georgia during the 1934 college football season. completed the season with a 7–3 record.

Schedule

References

Georgia
Georgia Bulldogs football seasons
Georgia Bulldogs football